The list of ship launches in 1760 includes a chronological list of some ships launched in 1760.


References

1760
Ship launches